The Croatia national under-21 speedway team is the national under-21 motorcycle speedway team of Croatia and is controlled by the Croatian Motorcycle Federation. Croatian riders was started in Under-21 World Cup once, in 2009 with Slovenian riders as "Adria" team. The best Croatian rider is Jurica Pavlic who was won two medals in Individual competition (silver medal in 2009 in Goričan, Croatia).

Competition

See also 
 Croatia national speedway team
 Croatia national under-19 speedway team

External links 
 Speedway at Croatian Motorcycle Federation website 

National speedway teams
Speedway
Speedway